Nitratireductor  is a genus of bacteria.

References

Phyllobacteriaceae
Bacteria genera